Jesse Q. Sutanto is a Chinese-Indonesian author. As of 2022, she has published six novels for adults, young adults, and middle grade readers. She is most famous for her novel Dial A for Aunties, which won the 2021 Comedy Women in Print Prize and has been optioned for a film by Netflix.

Personal life 
Sutanto grew up in a Chinese-Indonesian family, living in Singapore, Indonesia, and Oxford. She speaks Mandarin, Indonesian, and English with her family. She currently lives in Jakarta with her husband, who is English, and their two children.

Writing career 
Sutanto received her MFA in creative writing from Oxford University in 2009 and has been writing ever since. As of 2022, she has published six books for readers of all ages.

Dial A for Aunties 
In 2021, Sutanto published her hit novel, Dial A for Aunties. For this book, Sutanto became the first writer of color to win the United Kingdom's Comedy Women in Print Prize. The novel, which is a blend of romantic comedy and murder mystery, features Chinese-Indonesian culture through the lens of a girl and her four aunts.

In 2020, before Dial A for Aunties was even published, the film rights were bought by Netflix as a result of a bidding war. It will be directed by Nahnatchka Khan who is famous for creating the sitcom, Fresh off the Boat and produced by Fierce Baby Productions and Davis Entertainment. Sutanto will executive produce the film.

Published works 

 Dial A for Aunties (2021)
 The Obsession (2021)
 Four Aunties and a Wedding (2022)
 The New Girl (2022) 
 Well, That Was Unexpected (2022)
 Theo Tan and the Fox Spirit (2022)
 Vera Wong's Unsolicited Advice for Murderers (to be published in 2023)
 I'm Not Done With You Yet (to be published in 2023)
 Theo Tan and the Iron Fan (to be published in 2023)

References 

Living people
Chinese women novelists
Indonesian women novelists
Chinese Indonesian culture
21st-century Indonesian women writers
21st-century Chinese novelists
21st-century Chinese women writers
Year of birth missing (living people)